Gangadharpur Mahavidyamandir, established in 1981, is an undergraduate college at Gangadharpur in Howrah district, West Bengal, India. It is affiliated with the University of Calcutta.

Departments

Arts and Commerce

Bengali
English
Sanskrit
History
Political Science
Philosophy
Education
Commerce

Accreditation
Gangadharpur Mahavidyamandir is recognized by the University Grants Commission (UGC).

See also 
List of colleges affiliated to the University of Calcutta
Education in India
Education in West Bengal

References

External links
Gangadharpur Mahavidyamandir

Educational institutions established in 1981
University of Calcutta affiliates
Universities and colleges in Howrah district
1981 establishments in West Bengal